Flood control channels are large and empty basins which let water flow in and out (except during flooding) or dry channels that run below the street levels of some larger cities, so that if and when a flood occurs, the water will run into these channels, and eventually drain into a river or other body of water. Flood channels are sometimes built on the former courses of waterways as a way to reduce flooding.

Levees
Flood control channels are not to be confused with watercourses which are simply confined between levees. These structures may be made entirely of concrete, with concrete sides and an exposed bottom, with riprap sides and an exposed bottom, or completely unlined. They often contain grade control sills or weirs to prevent erosion and maintain a level streambed.

Distribution
By definition, flood control channels range from the size of a street gutter to a few hundred or even a few thousand feet wide in some rare cases. Flood control channels are found in most heavily developed areas in the world. One city with many of these channels is Los Angeles, as they became mandatory with the passage of the Flood Control Act of 1941 passed in the wake of the Los Angeles Flood of 1938.

See also
Drop structure
Urban runoff
Weir
Levee

External links
LA River Flood Control Channel
Guadalupe River Flood Control Channel

Flood control
Environmental engineering
Rivers